Coal Lake is a long, sinuous lake located approximately  southeast of the city of Edmonton, just northeast of the city of Wetaskiwin. The entire meltwater channel starts east of Nisku, wandering southeast through minor depressions and the chain of Saunders Lake, Ord Lake, three small unnamed lakes, Coal Lake and Driedmeat Lake.

Coal Lake was named in 1892 by J.D.A. Fitzpatrick, a Dominion Land Surveyor, for the coal beds present in many places along the northeast shore.

References

See also
List of lakes of Alberta

Lakes of Alberta
Leduc County
County of Wetaskiwin No. 10